Rich Jacobs (born 1972 in Long Beach, California) is an American artist and curator who currently lives and works in Brooklyn, New York. Jacobs has exhibited in the United States, Europe, Australia, New Zealand and Japan. In 2008, his work Minor Threat Family Tree was featured prominently along with other works of his at the London Ontario Live Arts Festival in Canada.

Inspired by graffiti, psychedelic and folk art, Jacobs' raw, colorful work frequently appears on a broad range of materials such as magazines, books, CD and LP covers (including most of the albums for the Salt Lake City-based group Iceburn), footwear, apparel (such as parkas, skirts and dresses), skateboards, buildings and pillows.

References

External links
 Interview with Rich Jacobs at Arcane Candy
 Interview with Rich Jacobs at Fecal Face
 Profile of Rich Jacobs at 96 Gillespie 
 Notes on 2007-08 co-exhibition at Needles and Pens Gallery
 Jacobs' work at Fifteen Cents Productions 

1972 births
American artists
Living people